The Four Nations Tournament was an association football tournament organized in China by the Chinese Football Association and International Sport and Leisure (ISL). The Championship was founded in 2000 as a single-elimination tournament with four national teams. However, it was abolished in 2001 due to the bankruptcy of ISL.

Tournaments

All-time top goalscorers

See also
 Four Nations Tournament (women's football)
 Yongchuan International Tournament
 China Cup

References

 
Football cup competitions in China
Chinese football friendly trophies